Xhumo is a village in Central District of Botswana. It is located close to Makgadikgadi Pan, and the population was 1,684 in 2011 census.

References

2. Xhumo Day Care ground breaking ceremony in Xhumo village -  http://www.noble.co.bw/2017/09/05/kanu-equipment-cements-early-childhood-education-xhumo-village/

Populated places in Central District (Botswana)
Villages in Botswana